These are the results of the 2009 IAAF World Athletics Final, which took place in Thessaloniki, Greece on 12 and 13 September.

The year's top seven athletes, based on their points ranking of the 2009 IAAF World Athletics Tour, qualified to compete in each event, with an extra four athletes selected for races of 1500 metres and above. One additional athlete, a wildcard, was allocated to each event by the IAAF and replacement athletes were admitted to replace the qualified athletes that could not attend the final.

Key

Track

100 metres

200 metres

400 metres

800 metres

1500 metres

3000 metres

5000 metres

110/100 metres hurdles

400 metres hurdles

3000 metres steeplechase

Field

High jump

Pole vault

Long jump

Triple jump

Shot put

Discus throw

Hammer throw

Javelin throw

References
General
2009 IAAF World Athletics Final results. IAAF. Retrieved on 2009-09-12.

Specific

External links
Official website
Official 2009 IAAF World Athletics Final Site
2009 World Athletics Tour – Final points standings
Event by event analysis from IAAF

World Athletics Final results
Events at the IAAF World Athletics Final